Markham was a provincial electoral district in Ontario, Canada created in 1986.

Tony Wong resigned in the fall of 2006 to successfully seek election to York Regional Council.  His provincial seat was filled in a by-election on February 8, 2007. However the riding was abolished at the October 4, 2007 provincial election, and redistributed between the new provincial ridings of Markham—Unionville and Oak Ridges—Markham as its federal counterpart already has been.

Members of Provincial Parliament

Election results

References

External links 
 Elections Ontario  1999 results and 2003 results

Former provincial electoral districts of Ontario
Politics of Markham, Ontario